Ivel Z3 was an Apple IIe compatible computer developed by Ivasim in 1980s.

References 

Personal computers